Myrl Goodwin (January 21, 1901 - February 14, 1979) was a professional football player from Paducah, Texas. After going to high school in Colorado, Goodwin attended Bucknell University and West Texas A&M University. Goodwin made his National Football League debut in 1928 with the Pottsville Maroons. He would go on to play three games for the Maroons. He played both college and professional football with his twin brother, Earl by his side.

1901 births
1979 deaths
Players of American football from Texas
Bucknell Bison football players
West Texas A&M Buffaloes football players
Pottsville Maroons players
American twins
Twin sportspeople
People from Paducah, Texas